The 2002 congressional elections in Minnesota were held on November 5, 2002 to determine who would represent the state of Minnesota in the United States House of Representatives.

Minnesota had eight seats in the House, and the 2002 congressional election was the first held pursuant to the apportionment made according to the 2000 United States Census. Representatives are elected for two-year terms; those elected served in the 108th Congress from January 3, 2003 until January 3, 2005.  The election coincided with a U.S. Senate election and a gubernatorial election. DFLer Bill Luther, formerly of the 6th congressional district, who was redistricted into the 2nd congressional district, was the only incumbent in Minnesota's House delegation who failed to win reelection.

Overview

District 1

Incumbent Republican Gil Gutknecht, who had represented Minnesota's 1st congressional district since 1994, ran against Steve Andreasen of the DFL and Greg Mikkelson of the Green Party. Gutknecht easily won a fifth term, defeating second-place Pomeroy by a landslide 26.85 percent margin, as Mikkelson finished at a very distant third.

DFL primary

Candidates
 Steve Andreasen, former Director for Defense Policy and Arms Control on the National Security Council (1993-2001)

Results

Green primary

Candidates
 Greg Mikkelson

Results

Republican primary

Candidates
 Gil Gutknecht, incumbent U.S. Representative since 1994

Results

General election

Results

District 2

In the reapportionment that occurred in consequence of the 2000 United States Census, Mark Kennedy, the incumbent Republican from the Minnesota's 2nd congressional district, was redistricted into the 6th congressional district, while Bill Luther, the incumbent DFLer from the 6th congressional district was redistricted into the 2nd congressional district. Thus, Luther was forced to run in the new congressional district 2 in the 2002 election, while Kennedy ran in the new congressional district 6.

Luther, who was first elected to Congress in 1994, was unchallenged in the DFL primary. However, in the general election race against Republican challenger John Kline, the more conservative composition of the new district worked against Luther. Luther's campaign was further harmed by political fallout that was created when Samuel Garst, a Luther campaign staffer, entered the race on the "No New Taxes" line in an attempt to use a false flag to split the conservative vote. In the end, Garst was only able to secure 4.33 percent of the vote, and the political damage to Luther contributed to Kline winning the election by a margin of more than 11 percent.

DFL primary

Candidates
 Bill Luther, incumbent U.S. Representative since 1995

Results

Republican primary

Candidates
 John Kline, retired Colonel (USMC)

Results

General election

Results

District 3

Incumbent Republican Jim Ramstad, who was first elected in 1990, defeated DFL challenger Darryl Stanton, and won election to his seventh term in Congress, by a landslide 44.14 percent margin.

DFL primary

Candidates
 Darryl Stanton

Results

Republican primary

Candidates
 Jim Ramstad, incumbent U.S. Representative since 1991

Results

General election

Results

District 4

Incumbent DFLer Betty McCollum, who was first elected in 2000, faced off against Clyde Billington of the Republican Party of Minnesota and Scott J. Raskiewicz of the Green Party of Minnesota. Defeating Billington by a comfortable 28 percent margin, McCollum easily won her second term in Congress, as Raskiewicz finished a very distant third.

DFL primary

Candidates
 Betty McCollum, incumbent U.S. Representative since 2001

Results

Green primary

Candidates
 Scott J. Raskiewicz

Results

Republican primary

Candidates
 Clyde Billington

Results

General election

Results

District 5

Incumbent DFLer Martin Sabo, who was first elected in 1978, had no difficulty winning his 13th term in Congress, defeating Republican challenger Daniel Nielsen Mathias by a margin of just over 41 percent, while Green candidate Tim Davis finished a distant third.

DFL primary

Candidates
 Martin Olav Sabo, incumbent U.S. Representative since 1979

Results

Green primary

Candidates
 Tim Davis

Results

Republican primary

Candidates
 Daniel Nielsen Mathias

Results

General election

Results

District 6

In the reapportionment that occurred in consequence of the 2000 United States Census, Mark Kennedy, the incumbent Republican from the Minnesota's 2nd congressional district, was redistricted into the 6th congressional district, while Bill Luther, the incumbent DFLer from the 6th congressional district was redistricted into the 2nd congressional district. Thus, Kennedy was forced to run in the new congressional district 6 in the 2002 election, while Luther ran in the new congressional district 2.

Kennedy, who was first elected in 2000, encountered little difficulty in winning his second term in Congress, defeating DFL challenger Janet Robert by a landslide margin of 22.28 percent, while Independence Party candidate Dan Becker finished a distant third.

DFL primary

Candidates
 Janet Robert

Results

Independence primary

Candidates
 Dan Becker

Results

Republican primary

Candidates
 Mark R. Kennedy, incumbent U.S. Representative since 2001

Results

General election

Results

District 7

Incumbent DFLer Collin Peterson, who was first elected in 1990, faced no difficulty winning his eighth term in Congress, defeating Republican challenger Dan Stevens by a landslide 30.63 percent margin.

DFL primary

Candidates
 Collin C. Peterson, incumbent U.S. Representative since 1991

Results

Republican primary

Candidates
 Dan Stevens

Results

General election

Results

District 8

Incumbent DFLer Jim Oberstar, who was first elected in 1974, had no difficulty winning his 15th term in Congress, defeating Republican challenger Bob Lemen by a margin of more than 37 percent.

DFL primary

Candidates
 James L. Oberstar, incumbent U.S. Representative since 1975

Results

Republican primary

Candidates
 Bob Lemen
 Warren L. Nelson

Results

General election

Results

References

2002
Minnesota
2002 Minnesota elections